Culex (Oculeomyia) infula is a species of mosquito belonging to the genus Culex. It is found in Bangladesh, India, Indonesia, Malaysia, Myanmar, Nepal, Philippines, Singapore, Sri Lanka, Thailand, and Vietnam. Adults mainly feeds on cattle
but infrequently shows a low proportion of human and bird blood meals. Larvae can be found in water courses with high content of algal populations. In 1998, the species was identified as a vector of Japanese encephalitis virus.

References

External links 
Oculeomyia Theobald, 1907 - Mosquito Taxonomic Inventory

infula
Insects described in 1901